Deidre Goodwin (born September 15, 1969, Oklahoma City, Oklahoma) is an American actress known for such films and television series as Chicago, Half Nelson, Life on Mars, The Bourne Legacy and Across the Universe.

Career
A stage and musical theatre actress who has appeared in such Broadway productions as A Chorus Line and Silence! The Musical, as well as productions of Chicago, Nine, The Boys From Syracuse, and The Rocky Horror Show, she is a graduate of Southwest Missouri State University. She serves on the faculty of the New York Film Academy. She is also the imaging voice for WCBS and KYW.

Theatre
In 2006, Goodwin appeared as Sheila Bryant in the Broadway revival of A Chorus Line.

Filmography

Film

Television

References

External links
 
 

African-American actresses
American film actresses
American television actresses
American musical theatre actresses
Living people
1969 births
Actresses from Oklahoma City
Missouri State University alumni
Outstanding Performance by a Cast in a Motion Picture Screen Actors Guild Award winners
20th-century African-American women singers
21st-century African-American people
21st-century African-American women